Lawrence County is a county located in the U.S. state of Kentucky. As of the 2020 census, the population was 16,293.  Its county seat is Louisa. The county is named for James Lawrence, and co-founded by Isaac Bolt, who served as a Lawrence County Commissioner and Justice of the Peace. Lawrence County is the home of bluegrass music and country music star Tyler Childers. It is the birthplace of the late Chief Justice of the United States Frederick Moore Vinson and former Kentucky Governor Paul E. Patton. In regard to alcoholic beverage sales, Lawrence County is considered a "moist" county, meaning alcohol sales are only allowed within the city limits of Louisa. There are no alcohol sales within the rest of the county. Only two stores sell liquor (to prevent a monopoly), and most convenience stores sell beer and malted beverages.

History
Lawrence County was established in 1821 from land given by Floyd and Greenup Counties. Four courthouses have served Lawrence County; the first was completed in 1823.

Geography

The bridge from Louisa, in eastern Lawrence County, to Fort Gay, West Virginia is something of a geographic and architectural oddity. The quarter-mile concrete span spans across the Levisa Fork and the Tug River that come together and form the Big Sandy River, connects two states and has a right turn at its halfway point, which connects traffic to the Point Section neighborhood of Louisa.

Yatesville Lake State Park
Yatesville Lake was opened in 1992 and is a  reservoir managed by the Army Corps of Engineers.  Yatesville Lake provides flood control for the region as well as recreational opportunities.  The Corps manages a boat ramp at the Rich Creek area.

 Carter County  (northwest)
 Boyd County  (north)
 Wayne County, West Virginia  (east)
 Martin County  (southeast)
 Johnson County  (south)
 Morgan County  (southwest)
 Elliott County  (west)

Demographics

As of the census of 2000, there were 15,569 people, 5,954 households, and 4,477 families in the county. The racial makeup of the county was 98.93% White, 0.10% Black or African American, 0.28% Native American, 0.07% Asian, 0.01% Pacific Islander, 0.05% from other races, and 0.56% from two or more races.  0.41%. were Hispanic or Latino of any race.

Of the 5,954 households 35.00% had children under the age of 18 living with them, 61.30% were married couples living together, 10.50% had a female householder with no husband present, and 24.80% were non-families. 22.40% of households were one person and 10.00% were one person aged 65 or older.  The average household size was 2.59 and the average family size was 3.02.

The age distribution was 25.30% under the age of 18, 8.80% from 18 to 24, 28.70% from 25 to 44, 24.70% from 45 to 64, and 12.40% 65 or older.  The median age was 36 years. For every 100 females, there were 97.30 males.  For every 100 females age 18 and over, there were 93.00 males.

The median household income was $21,610 and the median family income  was $26,113. Males had a median income of $30,735 versus $19,174 for females. The per capita income for the county was $12,008.  About 25.30% of families and 30.70% of the population were below the poverty line, including 40.00% of those under age 18 and 27.30% of those age 65 or over.

Politics

Communities

 Blaine
 Cherryville
 Fallsburg
 Kise
 Louisa (county seat)
 Ulysses
 Lowmansville
 Webbville

See also

 Dry counties
 National Register of Historic Places listings in Lawrence County, Kentucky
 Purgatory (Tyler Childers album)

References

Further reading

External links
 Lawrence County Schools
 Lawrence County Tourism Commission
 The Kentucky Highlands Project

 
Kentucky counties
Counties of Appalachia
1821 establishments in Kentucky
Populated places established in 1821